The military commissioning schools are educational institutions conducting career commissioned officer training programmes. Education acquired at such schools is higher military education (level 6 according to International Standard Classification of Education). These programmes are named specialitet and take 5 years. Graduates of commissioning schools are assigned the military rank of lieutenant.

The commissioning schools are the first (tactical) level of officer training. Their graduates are appointed as platoon/company commanders and at equivalent positions. After several years of active duty service they can entry military academy for further education.

History
The Russian military education system, inherited from the Soviet Union, trains officer-specialists in narrowly-defined military occupational specialties. Modern Russian military educational institutions conducting commissioning programmes may have different names (academy, institute, higher school), it stems from tradition and has no effect on the content of aforementioned programmes.

At the moment, some commissioning schools also conduct warrant officer programmes.

List of Russian military educational institutions conducting commissioning officer training programmes

General-purpose military commissioning schools
 S. M. Kirov Military Medical Academy
 Krasnodar Higher Military School named for Army General S.M. Shtemenko
 Military Institute of Physical Culture
 Military University of Radioelectronics
 Military University of the Ministry of Defense of the Russian Federation

Military commissioning schools of the Ground Forces
 Budyonny Military Academy of the Signal Corps
 Far Eastern Higher Combined Arms Command School
 Kazan Higher Tank Command School
 Mikhailovskaya Military Artillery Academy
 Military Academy of Field Anti-Aircraft Defense
 Military Logistics Academy
 Moscow Higher Military Command School
 NBC Protection Military Academy
 Novosibirsk Higher Military Command School
 Tyumen Higher Military Engineer Command School named after A.I. Proshlyakov

Military commissioning schools of the Navy
 Kuznetsov Naval Academy
 Nakhimov Higher Naval School
 Pacific Higher Naval School

Military commissioning schools of the Aerospace Forces
 A.F. Mozhaysky Military-Space Academy
 Krasnodar Higher Military Aviation School of Pilots
 Yaroslavl Higher Military School of Anti-Aircraft Warfare
 Zhukov Air and Space Defence Academy
 Zhukovsky – Gagarin Air Force Academy

Military commissioning schools of the Airborne Forces
 Ryazan Guards Higher Airborne Command School

Military commissioning schools of the Strategic Rocket Forces
 Peter the Great Military Academy of the Strategic Missile Forces

References

External links
 List of Russian military educational institutions

Military education and training in Russia
Military officer training